Condensin-2 complex subunit H2, also known as chromosome-associated protein H2 (CAP-H2) or non-SMC condensin II complex subunit H2 (NCAPH2), is a protein that in humans is encoded by the NCAPH2 gene. CAP-H2 is a subunit of condensin II, a large protein complex involved in chromosome condensation.

References

Further reading